Nietków  (formerly Nietków Polski; , from 1937 to 1945: Schlesisch Nettkow) is a village in the administrative district of Gmina Czerwieńsk, within Zielona Góra County, Lubusz Voivodeship, in western Poland.

The village has a population of 1,302.

While part of Medieval Poland, in the early 14th-century Liber fundationis episcopatus Vratislaviensis the village appeared under the Latinized name Necka. Its name probably comes from the Polish word niecka. In the following centuries it was known as Nietków Polski and under the Germanized name of Polnisch Nettkow. Between 1871 and 1945 it was part of Germany, and during the Nazi campaign of removing place names of Polish origin, it was renamed Schlesisch Nettkow. Since 1945, simply as Nietków, it is again part of Poland. The village was affected by the 1997 Central European flood.

Nietków has a historic church of the Ascension of Jesus and a park dating back to the 18th century.

Notable residents
 Friedrich Rudolf von Rothenburg (1710–1751), Prussian general
 Friedrich Schulz (1897–1976), Wehrmacht general

References

Villages in Zielona Góra County